The is a list of South African mass media, including newspapers, television stations, radio stations and various alternative media.

Newspapers

National
Beeld (available in 5 of 9 provinces)
Business Day
City Press
Daily Maverick
Daily Sun
Mail & Guardian
News Everyday
The New Age
Rapport 
SAMM News -  currently available online
The Sowetan
Sunday Independent
Sunday Sun
Sunday Times
Sunday World
The Witness
ILANGA
Laudium Sun

Television broadcasters

Terrestrial and satellite television channels

Free-To-Air 
eMedia Investments
e.tv
eMovies
eMovies Extra
eExtra
eReality
ePlesier
eToonz
eXposed
eNCA
South African Broadcasting Corporation
SABC 1
SABC 2
SABC 3
SABC News
SABC Education
SABC Sport

Subscription-based 
MultiChoice

 M-Net
Me
M-Net Movies
Mzansi Magic
KykNET
Africa Magic
Vuzu
One Magic
Novela Magic
TOPS

Independent Stations
Moja Love
People's Weather
Mindset Learn
Newzroom Afrika
DBE TV
WildEarth
Business Day TV
Parliamentary TV
Via
BRICS TV
Roots TV
OnseTV
MyTV
The Home Channel
Ignition TV
Supa TV
Honey
Hilaal TV
Racing240
Glow TV

Community Stations 

GauTV
itv
1KZN
 Rising Sun TV (StarSat)
Mpuma Kapa TV
Cape Town TV
Soweto TV via DStv until digital switch
Tshwane TV
Deen TV
Glow TV
Onse TV
Nongoma TV
MYtv
 1 Free State Television via StarSat

Streaming Media 

 Showmax
 eVOD
 SABC Plus (formally called TelkomONE)
Netflix
Amazon Prime
BritBox
Disney+

Direct to home satellite broadcasters
DStv
OpenView HD
StarSat
7 AFRICA TV NETWORK

New satellite broadcasting licensees (not yet operational)
e-Sat
Telkom Media

New IPTV licensees (not yet operational)
Telkom Media

Radio stations
See: List of radio stations in South Africa

Street newspapers 

 Big Issue
 Homeless talk - a small newspaper produced in Johannesburg; its content is largely about the plight of the homeless; on sale at select shops and most traffic lights in Johannesburg

Internet
South Africa Today
Quackdown (Exposes medical fraud and quackery)
Bizcommunity.com
ispotdaily.com
News24
Thesouthafrican.com
News Everyday
Saffarazzi
The South African
ZWBDC.co.za
EBNewsDaily
Briefly.co.za

See also
Africa Media Online
Alternative media in South Africa
List of magazines in South Africa

References

Further reading

External links
Contact directory: media contacts, South African Government communications
News and media, South African Government information